The 1970 NCAA men's volleyball tournament was the first annual tournament to determine the national champion of NCAA men's college volleyball. The tournament was played at Pauley Pavilion in Los Angeles, California.

UCLA defeated Long Beach State in the championship match (3 sets to 0) to win their first national title. UCLA's Dane Holtzman was named Most Outstanding Player of the tournament.

Qualification
Until the creation of the NCAA Men's Division III Volleyball Championship in 2012, there was only a single national championship for men's volleyball. As such, all NCAA men's volleyball programs (whether from the University Division, or the  College Division) were eligible. A total of 4 teams were invited to contest this championship.

Results

Round robin

|}

|}

Bracket

All tournament team 
Dane Holtzman, UCLA (Most Outstanding Player)
Kirk Kilgour, UCLA
Ed Becker, UCLA
Dodger Parker, Long Beach State
Craig Foley, Long Beach State
Tom Bonynge, UC Santa Barbara

See also 
 NCAA Men's National Collegiate Volleyball Championship

References

1970
NCAA Men's Volleyball Championship
NCAA Men's Volleyball Championship
Volleyball in California
1970 in sports in California
May 1970 sports events in the United States